The women's 4 x 100 metres relay at the 2008 African Championships in Athletics was held on May 1–2.

Medalists

Results

Heats
Qualification: First 3 teams of each heat (Q) plus the next 2 fastest (q) qualified for the final.

Final

External links
Results (Archived)

2008 African Championships in Athletics
Relays at the African Championships in Athletics
2008 in women's athletics